The 123rd Regiment of Foot was an infantry regiment of the British Army, formed in 1762 and disbanded in 1764. Its colonel was John Pomeroy.

References

External links

Infantry regiments of the British Army
Military units and formations established in 1762
Military units and formations disestablished in 1764